RPF may refer to:

Computing 
 Raster Product Format, a GIS file format
Reverse-path forwarding, in networking
Reverse power feeding, in broadband networking

Medicine 
Renal plasma flow, a metric
Retroperitoneal fibrosis, a disease

Military 
Railway Protection Force, in India
Rohingya Patriotic Front, in Bangladesh
  (Rpf.), unit of the German

Political parties 
 , France (1947–1955)
 , France (1999–2011)
 , Netherlands (1975–2003)
 Rwandan Patriotic Front, Rwanda (founded 1994)

Other uses 
Radioisotope Production Facility, in Egypt
Real person fiction
Rehabilitation Project Force, a Scientology program